Jasdan State was a princely state in Saurashtra during the British Raj. Its last ruler signed the accession to the Indian Union on 15 February 1948. The capital of the state was in Jasdan town.

History
Jasdan state was founded in 1665 when Vika Khachar defeated the Khumans of Kherdi. In 1807, after its ruler Vajsur Khachar came to an agreement with the British and the Gaikwar, it became a British protectorate. Later in the 19th century Jasdan became part of the Kathiawar Agency of the Bombay Presidency.

Jasdan was the biggest kathi state in British India issuing its own postage stamps.

Rulers 
Jasdan State was ruled by Kathi Kshatriya belonging to Khachar dynasty of Kathiawar region The rulers of the state bore the title 'Darbar'.
.... – 1809                Vajsur Odha Khachar                (d. 1809)
1809 – 27 October 1851         Shela Vajsur Khachar II            (d. 1851)
1852 – 1904                Ala Shela Khachar Shri Vajdur Oda  (b. 1831 – d. 1904)
1904 – 21 December 1912         Odha Ala Khachar II                (d. 1912)
21 Dec 1912 – 10 July 1919  Vajsur Odha Khachar II             (d. 1919)
11 Jul 1919 – 15 August 1947  Ala Vajsur Khachar                 (b. 1905 – d. 1973)
11 Jul 1919 –  1 December 1924  .... –
17 November 1997
Shivraj Ala Khachar I

Notable members of royal family
 Lavkumar Khachar, ornithologist 
 Yuvraj saheb Raviraj Khachar(CROWN PRINCE)

See also
Political integration of India
Baroda, Western India and Gujarat States Agency
Saurashtra (region)

References

Kathiawar Agency
Rajputs
Rajkot district
States and territories established in 1665
1665 establishments in India
1948 disestablishments in India